Balada may refer to:

Balada or baladesc, an Occitan literary genre related to dansa
Balada, a village in the municipal term of Sant Jaume d'Enveja, Spain
Leonardo Balada (born 1933), Catalan American composer
"Balada romántica", as Latin ballad is known in Spanish
"Balada" (song), a 2012 Portuguese song by Gusttavo Lima

See also
 Balad (disambiguation)
Ballad (disambiguation)